University Tuberculosis Hospital was a sanatorium located on Marquam Hill in Portland, Oregon, United States, established in 1939. The hospital was the third sanatorium to open in the state of Oregon after the state legislature mandated  public health care for tuberculosis patients in 1909. 

The hospital was active until 1963, when the number of tuberculosis patients in the state had dwindled, and the Oregon State Tuberculosis Hospital in Salem was able to care for those with the disease.

The former hospital is now referred to as the Campus Services Building and is part of the larger campus for Oregon Health & Science University on Marquam Hill.

See also
List of hospitals in Portland, Oregon
List of sanatoria in the United States
Oregon Health & Science University
Campus Services Building

References

1939 establishments in Oregon
Defunct hospitals in Oregon
Tuberculosis sanatoria in the United States
1963 disestablishments in Oregon
Hospitals established in 1939